Bafang is a town and commune in Cameroon situated in the Haut-Nkam division of the West Province.
 
It lies at the heart of the territory of the Bamiléké people, and has a population of roughly 33,324. (2012)

Religion 
Its cathedral, Cathédrale du Cœur-Immaculé de Marie, is the See of the Roman Catholic Diocese of Bafang, a suffragan of the Metropolitan Archdiocese of Douala, like the Roman Catholic Diocese of Nkongsamba, which it was split off from in 2011.

Notable people 
 Tony Tchani, professional football player
 Michael Ngadeu-Ngadjui, professional football player of Slavia Prague and Cameroon National Team

See also
Communes of Cameroon

References

External links 
 GigaCatholic
 

Communes of Cameroon
Populated places in West Region (Cameroon)